Vrpolje can refer to:

 Vrpolje, a village and a municipality in Slavonia, Croatia
 Vrpolje (Posušje), a village in southwestern Bosnia and Herzegovina
 Vrpolje Zagora, a village in southeastern Bosnia and Herzegovina
 Vrpolje Ljubomir, a village in southeastern Bosnia and Herzegovina
 Vrpolje, Šibenik, a village near Šibenik, Šibenik-Knin County, Croatia
 Vrpolje, Knin, a village near Knin, Šibenik-Knin County, Croatia
 Vrpolje, Split-Dalmatia County, a village near Trilj, Croatia